Harpalus amputatus is a species of ground beetle in the subfamily Harpalinae. It was described by Say in 1830. It can be found in China, Mongolia, Russia, and the United States.

References

amputatus
Beetles described in 1830